The 1977 Hawaii Rainbow Warriors football team represented the University of Hawaiʻi at Mānoa as an independent during the 1977 NCAA Division I football season. In their first season under head coach Dick Tomey, the Rainbow Warriors compiled a 5–6 record.

Schedule

References

Hawaii
Hawaii Rainbow Warriors football seasons
Hawaii Rainbow Warriors football